Alexandre Barbier (born July 7, 1979) is a French retired professional football player.

He played on the professional level in Ligue 2 for Stade Reims.

External links
 

1979 births
Living people
People from Le Chesnay
French footballers
Ligue 2 players
Stade de Reims players
Association football defenders
US Lusitanos Saint-Maur players
Footballers from Yvelines